Breanna Mackenzie Stewart (born Baldwin; born August 27, 1994) is an American professional basketball player for the New York Liberty of the Women's National Basketball Association (WNBA).

In high school, Stewart was the National Gatorade Player of the Year, the Gatorade Female Athlete of the Year, and a McDonald's All-American. She led the University of Connecticut Huskies to four national championships, was named the Final Four's most outstanding player a record four times, and was a three-time consensus national player of the year. Stewart was the first overall pick in the 2016 WNBA draft and was named the 2016 WNBA Rookie of the Year. She was named the WNBA MVP in 2018 and was named an All-Star in 2017, 2018 and 2021. She led the Storm to two championships in 2018 and 2020, and received the WNBA Finals MVP award both times. In 2021, Stewart was named to The W25 as one of the top 25 players of the WNBA's first 25 years.

As a member of the U.S. women's national team, Stewart has won gold medals in the 2016 and 2020 Olympics and at the 2014 and 2018 FIBA World Cup.

Early years
Stewart was born Breanna Mackenzie Baldwin in Syracuse, New York to a single mother, Heather Baldwin. Her biological father was not involved in her life, and her mother worked multiple jobs in order to support herself and her daughter. When Breanna was a toddler, her mother began dating Brian Stewart; they eventually married, and several years later he adopted Breanna. She has a younger half-brother, Connor. Breanna began playing basketball at an early age; in fifth grade, she decided to improve her game. Now six feet four inches tall, she had always been tall for her age, which often meant coaches wanted her inside as a rebounder. However, her father thought it would help if she had ball handling skills and a perimeter shooting ability. Stewart started a routine of dribbling around her block, wearing headphones. She completed enough loops to cover a mile. She continued the routine almost every day, improving her ball handling to the point she routinely dribbled behind her back or between her legs. Even after heading off to college, she still did the routine at home.

In a 2017 essay in The Players' Tribune, Stewart publicly revealed that she had been a victim of sexual abuse from age 9 to 11. She reported the abuse to her parents, who immediately called police. The perpetrator, who was married to her maternal aunt, confessed to the abuse and ultimately served prison time.

High school career
Stewart attended Cicero-North Syracuse High School (C-NS) in Cicero, New York, where she played for head coach Eric Smith. She was nicknamed "Bean" by her teammates, and "6–10" because of her wingspan. Stewart first played for the high school team while still in eighth grade. She played as a starter in most games, and averaged nine points, almost nine rebounds and seven blocks per game. In her freshman year, she almost doubled her point production, scoring 17 points per game. That year, her team had a 21–3 record, and made it to the regional final game.

In her sophomore year, she was a starter in every game, and upped her scoring average to 22 points per game. In that year, her team's record was 18–4. As a junior, she helped lead her team to the state AA public school title, with a 22–3 record for the year. Stewart averaged 24 points and 15 rebounds for the season. During her junior year, she announced that she would be attending the University of Connecticut. The day after the announcement, she dunked the ball in a game against Baldwinsville, her first career dunk. Stewart achieved a milestone on January 31, 2012, when she scored her 2,000th point, as part of a 31–0 run against Auburn.

Stewart was selected as a member of the 2012 McDonald's All-American team, which represented the 24 best female high school basketball players. The selected players were grouped into two squads that competed in the annual McDonald's All-American Game, held that year in Chicago. Stewart was selected to the 2012 Women's Basketball Coaches Association (WBCA) High School Coaches' All-America Team. The top 20 high school players in the country were named as WBCA All-Americans and were eligible to play in the all-star game. She participated in the 2012 WBCA High School All-America Game, scoring 10 points. Stewart was named the 2012 Naismith High School Girls' Player of the Year, the honor awarded by the Atlanta Tipoff Club to the best female high school basketball player in the country.
In March 2012, in a surprise presentation by Tamika Catchings, Stewart received the Gatorade National Girls Basketball Player of the Year award. Stewart was one of six finalists for the Gatorade High School Athlete of the Year.

High school tournaments
In addition to regularly scheduled post-season tournaments, the success of her high school team led to invitations to prominent national tournaments. In 2010, the C-NS team traveled to Philadelphia, New Jersey and Disney World; in 2011, the team went to the Nike Tournament of Champions in Phoenix, Arizona, considered the "premier showcase of all high school girls tournaments"; and in 2012, the Northstars played in a Basketball Hall of Fame Tournament in Springfield, Massachusetts.

Tournament of Champions

The Tournament of Champions is an annual event, since 1997, showcasing the best high school girls basketball teams. The 2011 event, held in Phoenix, Arizona, included 96 of the best basketball programs in the country. The C-NS team was assigned to the Smith Division, where they faced Bolingbrook High School, considered to be the number 1 team by USA Today. Despite being viewed as a 30-point underdog, Stewart helped her team to the first round upset, scoring 15 points in a 43–40 win.

In the quarter-final game, Stewart scored 29 points and had 19 rebounds to help the team beat the number 22 ranked team in the country, Dr. Phillips High School from Orlando, Florida. Although double-teamed, she scored ten points in a 12–0 run that gave C-NS a commanding 23-point lead early in the fourth quarter. That win secured a place in the semi-finals of the division. In the semi-final game, C-NS faced St. Mary's, the number 2 ranked team in the country. Stewart had 33 points and 16 rebounds, but it was not enough to overcome the scoring of the eventual champion of the tournament. Although the team lost that game, Stewart's overall performance earned her the most outstanding player of the tournament honors. Stewart was viewed as an offensive threat in the low post, high post and perimeter, and was effective as a defender because of her long wingspan.

2012 Hoophall Classic
Stewart's Northstars team were invited to play in the annual Hoophall Classic; the event was held in Springfield, Massachusetts, and typically featured some of the best high school teams in the country. Their opponents were the local West Springfield team, not nationally ranked, but 8–0 at the time of the meeting. The result was not close, as C-NS beat West Springfield 60–20, with Stewart alone scoring more points than the opposition. Stewart ended the game with 22 points, 18 rebounds and seven blocks, despite leaving the game in the third period and not returning. Her performance earned her the Most Outstanding Player award for the event.

USA Basketball

U16
Stewart was selected to join the USA Basketball U16 team, at age 14, the youngest member of the team; all other team members were 15 or 16. Initially, her parents turned down the invitation to join the team, worried about the amount of time she would be missing school. However, Mike Flynn, director of a prominent Amateur Athletic Union team, persuaded her parents that the invitation was an honor, so they relented. At the time, she stood six feet, three inches, the same height as Kiah Stokes and Elizabeth Williams. Despite being the youngest, she earned the starting role for all five games, scoring just under ten points per games, tying Elizabeth Williams for the team lead in blocks. Stewart helped the team win the gold medal in the First FIBA Americas U16 Championship for Women, held in Mexico City. The win secured an automatic bid to the 2010 FIBA U17 World Championship, held in Rodez and Toulouse, France.

U17
Stewart continued with the USA team as it became the U17 team. The USA team won all eight games and the gold medal in the 2010 FIBA U17 World Championship for Women. Stewart earned a starting role in all eight games. In the first game, against the host team from France, she led all scorers with 13 points. In the final preliminary game against Japan, she led all scorers with 30 points. In the tournament, she averaged 12.8 points per game, second only to Elizabeth Williams at 13.5 points per game. Stewart was the team leader with 18 blocks.

U19

In 2011, Stewart was selected to be on the USA Basketball U19 team. The U18 team won the 2010 Americas Championship, thus earning an automatic bid to the U19 World Championship, held in Puerto Montt, Chile. The USA won their first five games, but then came up short, losing to Canada 64–52. They were still qualified for the medal round, and played against France in the quarter-final; the USA was down by 13 points early in the game, but took a lead with just over a minute to go in the game and won 70–64. The USA took an early lead in the semi-final against Brazil, and qualified for the gold medal game. The final was against Spain, which the USA won 69–46. Although she was one of the youngest players on the team, Stewart averaged 11.2 points per game to post the highest scoring average of the USA players. She was one of the five players named to the all tournament team; Ariel Massengale was the other USA player to earn all tournament honors.

2011 Pan American Games
She competed for the United States at the 2011 Pan American Games. The USA Pan American team members were usually chosen from the college ranks, although many of the other countries use their national teams, which include professional players. Stewart was the only high school player chosen for the 2011 Pan American team, and only the second high school player in Pan American team history for the USA teams. The only other high school player on a Pan American team was Nancy Lieberman, who played on the 1975 team, almost 20 years before Stewart was born.

The 2011 team finished seventh, the first time in history they did not earn a medal, but Stewart, almost three years younger than the next youngest player, was still a major contributor, scoring 15.4 points per game to lead the team in scoring. She also led the team in blocks and rebounds.

USA Basketball athlete of the year
Stewart was named the 2011 USA Basketball Female Athlete of the Year. USA Basketball cited her performance on the U19 team and the Pan American team. She was the second youngest on the U19 team, yet led the team in points, rebounds and blocks, helping to lead her team to a gold medal at the international competition, and earning a position on the all-tournament team. She occupies several spots in the U19 record books. She was named to the Pan American team, only the second high school player from the US to receive such a bid. Despite playing with college age players, she earned a starting position for all games, and again led the team in points, rebounds and blocks. The previous year's winner of the award was Diana Taurasi.

U18
Stewart was named to the USA Basketball U-18 team. She joined future UConn teammates Moriah Jefferson and Morgan Tuck on the 12-player squad that competed in the 2012 FIBA Americas U-18 National Championship, held in August 2012, in Puerto Rico. Stewart was the youngest, and only high school player, on the 2011 USA Women's Pan American Games team, but was the player with the most international experience on the team. The team started by winning their first four games with margins of victory of 40 points or more. This set up the championship game against Brazil. The team from Brazil started strong, and held a double-digit lead early in the game. After scoring only seven points in the first quarter, the team scored 21 or more in the next three quarters and reclaimed the lead. The USA won 71–47 to claim the gold medal.

Stewart was awarded the MVP trophy as the best player in the FIBA Americas U18 competition.

2013 U19 – Lithuania
Stewart, along with teammates Moriah Jefferson and Morgan Tuck, were three of the twelve players selected to be on the team representing the US at the U19 World Championship for Women held in Klaipėda and Panevėžys, Lithuania, in July 2013.
Stewart was named the USA Basketball Female Athlete of the Year for the second time. Only five other players have won this award more than once, Teresa Edwards, Lisa Leslie, Cheryl Miller, Dawn Staley and Diana Taurasi, and none have accomplished this at so young an age. Stewart helped the US to a 9–0 record in the 2013 FIBA U19 World Championship, leading to a gold medal for the team and MVP honors for Stewart.

Senior national team
Stewart was one of 33 finalists for the U.S. Women's FIBA World Championship for Women Roster. She was the only collegiate player out of 32 WNBA women's basketball players to be selected by the USA Basketball Women's National Team Player Selection Committee to compete for the final roster to represent the US at the FIBA World Championship for Women in Turkey during September and October 2014. Stewart made the final roster of 12 players, announced on September 23, 2014. Stewart won the gold medal with the team in 2014.

Stewart was a member of the USA Women's Pan American Team which participated in basketball at the 2015 Pan American Games held in Toronto, Ontario, Canada July 10 to 26, 2015. The USA won games against Brazil, the Dominican Republic, Puerto Rico, and Cuba, before losing the gold-medal game to the host team Canada.

USA Basketball named Stewart to the squad that played at the 2016 Summer Olympics in Rio de Janeiro. She won a gold medal with Team USA in 2016, in doing so joining Sheryl Swoopes, Cynthia Cooper-Dyke, Ruth Riley, Tamika Catchings and fellow UConn alums Kara Wolters, Swin Cash, Sue Bird, Diana Taurasi, and Maya Moore on the elite list of female basketball players to have won NCAA titles, WNBA Championships and Olympic gold medals.

She again won gold at the 2021 Summer Olympics in Tokyo where she averaged 15 points and 10 rebounds per game and was named the Olympic Tournament's Most Valueble Player and to the FIBA's all-star five team.

College career
Stewart was recruited by many schools, but after a campus visit to UConn in 2011, she told the coaching staff, "I would like to commit if you'd take me." Committing requires a formal letter of intent. Some players sign at a media event organized to cover the ceremony; Stewart signed her letter on the hood of her car, then gave it to her father at his office to fax to the school.

Freshman year
Stewart started her freshman year in strong form, scoring at least 20 points in three of her first four games. She scored a total of 169 points in her first ten games, which broke Maya Moore record for most points in a player's first 10 career games. However, her output slowed, and her scoring average dropped below ten points for her last eighteen regular season games. In March, she started early morning session with Chris Daily, associate head coach, to concentrate on shooting and post moves. She came back strong in the Big East tournament, with a total of 51 points, matching the number scored by Diana Taurasi in her tournament debut. Her strong performance continued in the NCAA tournament. She did not play in the first round, due to a calf injury, but scored 105 points in the last five games, earning her the award of the Most Outstanding Player of the Final Four, the first freshman to win the award since 1987.

Sophomore year

Stewart continued her stellar play in her sophomore year; her coaches noticed that she was demanding the ball more often, something she occasionally did as a freshman, but usually only if she thought she was playing well. By the end of her sophomore year, she was named the American Athletic Conference Player of the Year in the league's first season after the split of the original Big East Conference, an honor she would go on to win the following two seasons. Additionally, she was named AP Player of the Year, only the third time in history a sophomore had claimed the honor.  Stewart started and played in all 40 games of 2013–2014 season. She led the team at 19.4 points and 2.8 blocks per game, was second on the team with 8.1 rebounds per contest, and fourth on the squad at 49.7 percent shooting and her 291 field goals made was the third-highest single-season total in UConn annals. Her 324 boards marked the 12th-highest single-season total in school history, and her 110 rejections was the third-highest mark.

Junior year
Stewart earned American Athletic Conference Player of the Year honors for the second straight year in 2014–15, marking the fifth time a Husky was selected as the conference player of the year multiple times. She elevated nearly every aspect of her game during UConn's nine-game run through the postseason, averaging 18.1 points on 53.3 percent shooting to go along with 10.7 rebounds, and made 42.1 percent (8–19) of her attempts from beyond the 3-point arc during postseason action. She entered her senior year in 11th place on UConn's all-time scoring list with 1,960 career points, only 30 points behind Renee Montgomery's 10th-place total. She entered 2015–16 in fifth place on UConn's all-time blocked shots list with 288 career rejections and finished the season with 856 career rebounds, which is the 10th-highest total in UConn history.

Senior year
In her final season at UConn, Stewart posted career highs in rebounds (8.7 rpg), assists (4.0 apg) and blocks (126) while shooting 57.9 percent from the floor, sweeping all possible individual honors: she won her third straight Naismith College Player of the Year award, Wade Trophy, Associated Press Women's College Basketball Player of the Year award, USBWA Women's National Player of the Year award; she was also voted American Athletic Player of the Year (third time) and a third straight unanimous First-Team All-American in WBCA, USBWA and AP polls. She was the first-ever unanimous pick for AP Player of the Year and the first-ever three-time AP Player of the Year. In leading UConn to another national championship, she was part of the first four-time national championship class in NCAA history and also became the first player to be named the Final Four Most Outstanding Player four times. In her college career Stewart won 151 games and lost 5, which included four straight national championships. She is the first NCAA basketball player ever to tally 400 assists and block 400 shots. She was one of only six Huskies with at least 1,000 points and 1,000 rebounds. Stewart finished her career second on UConn's all-time scoring list at 2,676 career points, fourth with 1,179 career rebounds, and first in blocks (414).

Professional career

Seattle Storm
Stewart was drafted first overall in the 2016 WNBA draft by the Seattle Storm. She would play alongside superstar veteran point guard Sue Bird. Stewart immediately made an impact in the league as she scored 23 points in her debut game against the Los Angeles Sparks. As the season progressed, Stewart continued to dominate offensively as she scored a career-high 38 points in a win against the Atlanta Dream, which is the second most points scored in a game in franchise history, behind Lauren Jackson's 47 points. Stewart averaged 18.3 points per game, 9.3 rebounds per game and 1.8 blocks per game by the end of the 2016 season. She swept the Rookie of the Month awards for the entire season leading up to her winning the WNBA Rookie of the Year Award by a landslide. Stewart also broke the WNBA record for most defensive rebounds in a season with 277 defensive rebounds (surpassing Lisa Leslie's record in 2004). Despite the record, Stewart didn't win the rebounding title, sharing the top spot with Tina Charles for most rebounds, who led the league in rebounds per game average. Her season performance helped lead the Storm back to the playoffs for the first time in 3 years with the number 7 seed in the league, but lost in the first round elimination game to the Atlanta Dream. Stewart won the 2016 ESPY Award for Best Female Athlete. The other nominees were Elena Delle Donne, Katie Ledecky, and Simone Biles. She also won Best Women's College Basketball Player at the 2016 ESPYs.

In 2017, Stewart continued to flourish after an impressive rookie season. She was voted into the 2017 WNBA All-Star Game, making it her first career all-star game appearance. On August 5, 2017, Stewart scored a season-high 32 points in an 87–80 overtime loss to the San Antonio Stars. Stewart would finish the season with a career-high of 19.9 points per game as the Storm finished with the number 8 seed in the league, but were once again a first-round exit as they were eliminated by the Phoenix Mercury.

In 2018, Stewart would elevate her play to a superstar level. She was voted into the 2018 WNBA All-Star Game for her second all-star game appearance. On August 6, 2018, Stewart scored a season-high 32 points in a 96–80 victory over the New York Liberty, making it her fourth 30-point game of the season. By the end of the season, Stewart was ranked second in the league in scoring, she averaged new career-highs in scoring, steals, field goal percentage and three-point percentage. Stewart would also win the MVP award. This helped the Storm to a 26–8 record with the number 1 seed in the league, receiving a double-bye to the semi-finals. In the semi-finals, Stewart started off the series strong with a 28-point performance along with a career-high 6 three-pointers in a 91–87 victory against the Phoenix Mercury in Game 1. The Storm would end up winning the series in five games, advancing to the WNBA Finals for the first time since 2010. In the Finals, the Storm would defeat the Washington Mystics in a three-game sweep, winning their first championship in 8 years. Stewart averaged 25.7 points, 6.0 rebounds, 3.7 assists, 1.7 steals during the series. Stewart won Finals MVP, becoming the sixth player in league history to win both league MVP and Finals MVP in the same year.

Stewart missed the entire 2019 WNBA season after suffering an injury while playing for Russian club Dynamo Kursk in the 2019 EuroLeague Women final on April 14 that was later confirmed to be a torn Achilles. She returned to the U.S. the day after the injury and underwent surgery in Los Angeles later that week.
Because the WNBA currently lacks any kind of inactive list, the Storm suspended Stewart in order to free up a roster spot. Shortly thereafter, the league made her a paid ambassador for the 2019 season, making her the first active player to fill such a role. Stewart earned slightly more in that role than she would have as a player. In July 2020, Stewart returned to playing, rejoining her teammates at the IMG Academy for training. She won her second title with the Storm in 2020 and was named the 2020 WNBA Finals MVP. In 2020 Sports Illustrated named her one of its Sportspeople of the Year for her activism off the court. During the WNBA's 25th season in 2021, Stewart was named to The W25 as one of the top 25 players in league history.

New York Liberty
On February 1, 2023, Stewart signed with the New York Liberty in free agency.

Overseas
During her rookie season, Stewart signed with Shanghai Baoshan Dahua of the WCBA for the 2016–17 Chinese season. In 2017, Stewart re-signed with Shanghai Baoshan Dahua for the 2017–18 WCBA season.

In June 2018, Stewart signed with Dynamo Kursk of the Russian Premier League and was later named MVP of the EuroLeague Women regular season. In February 2020, Stewart signed with UMMC Ekaterinburg for the remainder of the 2019–20 European season. In November 2020, Stewart re-signed with UMMC Ekaterinburg for the 2020–21 European season.

She signed with Fenerbahçe Safiport on 1 July 2022 for EuroLeague Women season.

Career statistics

WNBA

Regular season

|-
| style="text-align:left;"| 2016
| style="text-align:left;"| Seattle
| 34 || 34 || 34.7|| .457 || .338 || .833 || 9.3 || 3.4 || 1.2 || 1.8 || 2.3|| 18.3
|-
| style="text-align:left;"| 2017
| style="text-align:left;"| Seattle
| 33 || 33 || 32.9 || .475 || .371 || .787 || 8.7 || 2.7 || 1.1 ||1.6 || 2.4 || 19.9
|-
|style="text-align:left;background:#afe6ba;"|2018†
| style="text-align:left;"| Seattle
| 34 || 34 || 31.6 || .529 || .415 || .820 || 8.4 || 2.5 || 1.4 ||1.4 || 1.8 || 21.8
|-
|style="text-align:left;background:#afe6ba;"|2020†
| style="text-align:left;"| Seattle
| 20 || 20 || 30.4 || .451 || .368 || .894 || 8.3 || 3.6 || 1.7 || 1.3 || 2.5 || 19.7
|-
| style="text-align:left;"| 2021
| style="text-align:left;"| Seattle
| 28 || 28 || 33.4 || .439 || .336 || .847 || 9.6 || 2.7 || 1.2 || 1.7 || 1.6 || 20.3
|-
| style="text-align:left;"| 2022
| style="text-align:left;"| Seattle
| 34 || 34 || 30.9 || .472 || .379 || .837 || 7.6 || 2.9 || 1.6 || 0.9 || 1.3 || 21.8
|-
| style="text-align:left;"| Career
| style="text-align:left;"| 6 years, 1 team
| 183 || 183 || 32.4  || .473 || .369 || .831 || 8.6 || 2.9 || 1.3 || 1.5 || 2.0 || 20.3

Playoffs

|-
| style="text-align:left;"| 2016
| style="text-align:left;"| Seattle
| 1 || 1 || 38.0 ||.600 || .500 || 1.000 || 7.0 || 3.0 || 2.0 || 0.0 || 0.0 || 19.0
|-
| style="text-align:left;"| 2017
| style="text-align:left;"| Seattle
| 1 || 1 || 36.2 || .353 || .500 || .818 || 8.0 || 1.0 || 1.0 || 2.0 || 3.0 || 23.0
|-
|style="text-align:left;background:#afe6ba;"| 2018†
| style="text-align:left;"| Seattle
| 8 || 8 || 37.1 || .466 || .416 || .823 || 6.8 || 2.5 || 1.2 || 0.8 || 2.3 || 24.6
|-
|style="text-align:left;background:#afe6ba;"| 2020†
| style="text-align:left;"| Seattle
| 6 || 6 || 32.5 || .538 || .500 || .852 || 7.8 || 4.0 || 1.7 || 1.7 || 1.2 || 25.7
|-
| style="text-align:left;"| 2022
| style="text-align:left;"| Seattle
| 6 || 6 || 38.8 || .513 || .520 || .892 || 9.5 || 4.2 || 1.0 || 1.8 || 2.0 || 27.0
|-
| style="text-align:left;"| Career
| style="text-align:left;"| 5 years, 1 team
| 22 || 22 || 36.4 || .497 || .475 || .856 || 7.9 || 3.3 || 1.3 || 1.4 || 1.8 || 25.2

College

Source

Awards and honors

International
 FIBA Women's World Cup MVP (2018)
 FIBA Under-19 Women's World Cup MVP (2013)
 USA Basketball Female Athlete of the Year (2011, 2013, 2018)

WNBA
 The W25 (top 25 players in league history) (2021)
Sports Illustrated Sportsperson of the Year (2020)
 Commissioner's Cup MVP (2021)
 Commissioner's Cup Champion (2021)
2x WNBA Finals MVP (2018, 2020)
2x WNBA Champion (2018, 2020)
WNBA MVP (2018)
WNBA All-Star (2017, 2018)
All-WNBA First Team (2018, 2020, 2021)
All-WNBA Second Team (2016)
WNBA All-Defensive Second Team (2016)
WNBA Rookie of the Year Award (2016)
ESPY Award for Best Female Athlete and Best Female College Player (2016)

Overseas
 EuroLeague Women Regular Season MVP (2019)
EuroLeague Women Champion (2021)
EuroLeague Women Final Four MVP (2021)

College
4x NCAA basketball tournament Most Outstanding Player (2013, 2014, 2015, 2016)(making her the first person to be most outstanding player of the Final Four four times)
3× Naismith College Player of the Year (2014, 2015, 2016)
3× USBWA Women's National Player of the Year (2014, 2015, 2016)
3× Associated Press Women's College Basketball Player of the Year (2014, 2015, 2016)(making her the first female college basketball player to win that award three times)
3× American Athletic Conference Women's Basketball Player of the Year (2014, 2015, 2016)
2x Wade Trophy (2015, 2016)
2x John R. Wooden Award (2015, 2016)
Senior CLASS Award (2016)
3x Honda Sports Award, basketball (2014,2015,2016)
Honda-Broderick Cup and named Collegiate Woman Athlete of the Year (2016)
James E. Sullivan Award, basketball (2015)
Ann Meyers Drysdale Award (2014)

High school
Naismith Prep Player of the Year (2012)
USA Today Player of the Year (2012)
Gatorade Female Basketball Player of the Year (2012)
Gatorade Female Athlete of the Year (2012)
McDonald's All-American (2012)
Gatorade New York Girls Basketball Player of the Year (2011)
USA Basketball Female Athlete of the Year (2011)
ESPN Rise All-America second team (2010)
Parade All-America fourth team (2010)

Personal life 
Stewart is married  to former WNBA and current EuroLeague Spanish professional basketball player Marta Xargay, three times Eurobasket champion and silver medalist in both the Olympics and World Cup with the Spain national basketball team. The couple started dating while teammates at Dynamo Kursk. Stewart proposed in May 2021 and they were married on July 6, 2021 on the rooftop of Stewart's apartment building. On August 9, 2021, within 48 hours of Stewart earning an Olympic gold medal in Tokyo, their daughter Ruby Mae Stewart-Xargay was born via surrogacy.

In 2016, Stewart signed a multi-year endorsement deal with Nike until 2021.

In 2021, she signed multi-year endorsement with Puma. In September 2022 she released the first female signature shoes for the first time in over a decade, called Stewie 1 Quiet Fire.

References

Further reading
 Current Biography Yearbook 2017. , 2017. Print.
 Altavilla, John. "Breanna Stewart: Tall On Talent, Short On Ego." Courant.com, Hartford Courant, November 14, 2014

External links

1994 births
Living people
21st-century American LGBT people
All-American college women's basketball players
American expatriate basketball people in China
American expatriate basketball people in Russia
American women's basketball players
Basketball players at the 2011 Pan American Games
Basketball players at the 2015 Pan American Games
Basketball players at the 2016 Summer Olympics
Basketball players at the 2020 Summer Olympics
Basketball players from Syracuse, New York
Centers (basketball)
LGBT basketball players
LGBT people from New York (state)
Lesbian sportswomen
McDonald's High School All-Americans
Medalists at the 2015 Pan American Games
Medalists at the 2016 Summer Olympics
Medalists at the 2020 Summer Olympics
Olympic gold medalists for the United States in basketball
Pan American Games medalists in basketball
Pan American Games silver medalists for the United States
Parade High School All-Americans (girls' basketball)
Power forwards (basketball)
Seattle Storm draft picks
Seattle Storm players
Shanghai Swordfish players
UConn Huskies women's basketball players
United States women's national basketball team players
Women's National Basketball Association first-overall draft picks
Women's National Basketball Association All-Stars
Fenerbahçe women's basketball players